Strobelite Seduction is the fifth solo album by the house DJ Kaskade. It was released on May 20, 2008, by Ultra Records.

The first single from the album, "Move for Me", with the Canadian progressive house/trance musician Deadmau5 and the vocalist Haley Gibby, reached number one on Billboard's Hot Dance Airplay chart on September 6, 2008, becoming Kaskade's fifth top ten hit, and his first number one, on the list. The dance single has become a crossover hit, managing to reach number 71 on the Canadian Hot 100 on February 14, 2009. The third single from the album, "Angel on My Shoulder" (with Tamra Keenan), was released in late 2008. It also found success on the dance chart, reaching number 5 on Billboard's Hot Dance Airplay Chart. The fourth and final single, "Step One Two", was released in late 2008 with remixes by various artists, such as Tommy Trash.

"I Remember", another collaboration with Deadmau5 and Haley, was released as the third single from Deadmau5's 2008 album Random Album Title. It became Kaskade's first UK hit, peaking inside the top 15 on the UK Singles Chart. The single was his second chart topper on the Billboard dance chart. The video clip which accompanied "I Remember" was filmed in Manchester, England.

The bonus track, the Adam K and Soha remix of "4 AM", became a digital single from the album. The original version of this track is featured on Kaskade's 2006 album Love Mysterious.

Track listing

Personnel
Ryan Raddon (Kaskade) - producer, writer
Finn Bjarnson - producer, writer
Joel Zimmerman (deadmau5) - producer, writer ("Move for Me" and "I Remember")
Haley Gibby (Haley) - vocals ("Move for Me", "Step One Two" and "I Remember")
Tamra Keenan (Tamra) - writer, vocals ("Angel On My Shoulder" and "Your Love Is Black")
Julien Louis Marc Aletti (Count De Money) - additional production, writer ("Back On You")
Raphael Marc Romain Aletti (Count De Money) - additional production, writer ("Back On You")
Sunsun - vocals ("Back On You", "I'll Never Dream" and "Are You Listening")
Latrice Barnett - vocals ("Pose")
John Hancock - writer ("Borrowed Theme" and "Your Love Is Black"), additional keyboards ("Pose")
Becky Jean Williams - writer, vocals ("Borrowed Theme", "One Heart" and "4 AM")
Late Night Alumni (Raddon, Bjarson, Hancock and Williams) - additional production ("Borrowed Theme")
Ellen Bridger - cello ("Your Love Is Black")
Aaron Ashton - violin ("Your Love Is Black")

Notes and references

2008 albums
Kaskade albums